The final tournament of the 2008 UEFA European Under-19 Championship was the 24th UEFA European Under-19 Championship, UEFA's premier competition for players under the age of 19. The tournament was held in the Czech Republic with matches played from 14 July to 26 July 2008. Players born after 1 January 1989 were eligible to participate in this competition. The top three teams in each group qualified for the 2009 U-20 World Cup.

Qualification
Qualification for the final tournament was played over two stages. The first qualifying stage divided the remaining 52 UEFA nations (minus the hosts, the Czech Republic) into 13 groups of four teams. Matches in the first stage were played from 24 September 2007 to 15 November 2007. The top two teams in each group and the two best third-placed teams then qualified for the elite qualifying stage, where the 28 teams were divided into seven groups of four. Matches in the elite qualifying stage were played from 1 March 2008 to 31 May 2008, when the top team from each group advanced to the final tournament.

The following teams qualified for the tournament:
  (as host)
 
 
  Germany

Squads

Final group stage
The groups were drawn on 1 June 2008 in Prague by the first vice-chairman of the UEFA Youth and Amateur Football Committee, Jim Boyce, and senior Czech internationals Petr Čech and Martin Fenin.

In the following tables:

Key:
Pld Matches played, W Won, D Drawn, L Lost, GF Goals for, GA Goals against, GD Goal Difference, Pts Points

Group A

Group B

Knock-out stage

Bracket

Semi-finals

Final

Goalscorers

4 goals
  Tomáš Necid
3 goals
  Richard Sukuta-Pasu
2 goals
  Jan Morávek
  Lars Bender
  Marcel Risse
  Alberto Paloschi
  Andrea Poli
  Emilio Nsue
1 goal
  Benjamin Mee
  Freddie Sears
  Daniel Sturridge

1 goal, cont.
  Dennis Diekmeier
  Timo Gebhart
  Savio Nsereko
  Stefan Reinartz
  Ömer Toprak
  Michalis Pavlis
  Olivér Nagy
  Krisztián Németh
  András Simon
  Giacomo Bonaventura
  Fernando Forestieri
  Silvano Raggio Garibaldi
  Jordi Alba
  Fran Mérida
  Aarón

Countries to participate in 2009 FIFA U-20 World Cup
 Germany

Team of the tournament
After the final, the UEFA technical team selected 22 players to integrate the "team of the tournament".

Goalkeepers
  David Button
  Péter Gulácsi
  Vincenzo Fiorillo

Defenders
  Jan Polák
  Ben Mee
  Dennis Diekmeier
  Alexander Eberlein
  Stefan Reinartz
  Vassilis Lambropoulos
  András Debreceni

Midfielders
  Jan Morávek
  Deniz Naki
  Savio Nsereko
  Kyriakos Papadopoulos
  Vladimir Koman
  Aarón Ñíguez

Forwards
  Tomáš Necid
  Timo Gebhart
  Richard Sukuta-Pasu
  Krisztián Németh
  Fernando Forestieri
  Emilio Nsue

References

External links
Official Site
2008 UEFA European Under-19 Championship technical report

 
2008
UEFA
UEFA European Under-19 Championship
Uefa European Under-19 Championship, 2008
Youth football in the Czech Republic
July 2008 sports events in Europe
2008 in youth association football